Base erosion and profit shifting (BEPS) refers to corporate tax planning strategies used by multinationals to "shift" profits from higher-tax jurisdictions to lower-tax jurisdictions or no-tax locations where there is little or no economic activity, thus "eroding" the "tax-base" of the higher-tax jurisdictions using deductible payments such as interest or royalties. For the government, the tax base is a company's income or profit. Tax is levied as a percentage on this income/profit. When that income / profit is transferred to another country or tax haven, the tax base is eroded and the company does not pay taxes to the country that is generating the income. As a result, tax revenues are reduced and the government is detained. The Organization for Economic Co-operation and Development (OECD) define BEPS strategies as "exploiting gaps and mismatches in tax rules". While some of the tactics are illegal, the majority are not. 

Corporate tax havens offer BEPS tools to "shift" profits to the haven, and additional BEPS tools to avoid paying taxes within the haven (e.g. Ireland's "CAIA tool"). BEPS activities cost nations 100-240 billion dollars in lost revenue each year, which is 4-10 percent of worldwide corporate income tax collection. It is alleged that BEPS tools are associated mostly with American technology and life science multinationals. A few studies showed that use of the BEPS tools by American multinationals maximized long–term American Treasury revenue and shareholder return, at the expense of other countries.

Scale
In January 2017 the OECD estimated that BEPS tools are responsible for tax losses of circa $100–240 billion per annum. In June 2018 an investigation by tax academic Gabriel Zucman (et alia), estimated that the figure is closer to $200 billion per annum. The Tax Justice Network estimated that profits of $660 billion were "shifted" in 2015 (due to Apple's Q1 2015 leprechaun economics restructuring, the largest individual BEPS transaction in history. The effect of BEPS tools is most felt in developing economies, who are denied the tax revenues needed to build infrastructure.

Most BEPS activity is associated with industries with intellectual property ("IP"), namely Technology (e.g. Apple, Google, Microsoft, Oracle), and Life Sciences (e.g. Allergan, Medtronic, Pfizer and Merck & Co) (see here) as our economy is changing to become more digital and knowledge based. IP is described as the raw materials of tax avoidance, and IP–based BEPS tools are responsible for the largest global BEPS income flows. Intangible assets such as patents, designs, trademarks (or brands) and copyrights are usually easy to identify, value and transfer, which is why they are attractive in tax planning structures for multinational companies, especially since these rights are not generally geographically bound and are therefore highly mobile. As a result, they can be relocated without significant costs using planned licensing structures. Several multinational companies use IP structuring models to separate the ownership, funding, maintenance and use rights of intangible assets from the actual activities and physical location of intangible assets to operate in a manner that the income made from the intangibles in one location is received in another location with a low/no tax regime. As such IP models have a meaningful role in the taxation of multinationals. Multinationals, for instance can establish licensing and patent holding companies suitable for offshore locations to acquire, exploit, license or sublicense IP rights for their foreign subsidiaries. Then profits can be shifted from the foreign subsidiary to the offshore patent owning company where low to no taxes are applied on the royalties earned. Any fees derived by the licensing and patent holding company from the exploitation of the intellectual property will be exempt from the tax or subject to a low tax rate in the tax haven jurisdiction, these companies can also be used to avoid high withholding taxes that are normally charged on royalties coming from the country in which they are derived, furthermore they can be reduced by double taxation treaties between countries. Many countries allow for the deductions in respect of expenditure on research and development (R&D) or on the acquisition of IP. As such MNE's can set up R&D facilities in countries where the best tax advantage can be obtained. As such MNEs can make use of an attractive research infrastructure and generous R&D tax incentives in one country and benefit in another from low tax rates on the income from exploiting intangible assets.

IP tax planning models such as these successfully result in profit shifting which in most instances may lead to base erosion of the tax base. Corporate tax havens have some of the most advanced IP tax legislation in their statute books.

Intra group debts are another common way multinationals avoid taxes. Intra-group debts are particularly simple to use, as they do not involve third parties and “can be created with the wave of a pen or keystroke”. They often do not require any movement of assets, functions or personnel within a corporate group, nor any major change of its operations. Furthermore, intra-group debts provide significant flexibility for manipulations, as explained in a paper released by the United Nations. The popularity of using intra-group debts as a tax avoidance tool is further enhanced by the fact that in general they are not recognized under accounting standards and therefore do not affect consolidated financial statements of MNEs. It is not surprising that the OECD describes the BEPS risks arising from intra-group debt as the “main tax policy concerns surrounding interest deductions” (emphasis added).

Most BEPS activity is also most associated with U.S. multinationals, and is attributed to the historical U.S. "worldwide" corporate taxation system. Before the Tax Cuts and Jobs Act of 2017 (TCJA), the U.S. was one of only eight jurisdictions to operate a "worldwide" tax system. Most global jurisdictions operate a "territorial" corporate tax system with lower tax rates for foreign sourced income, thus avoiding the need to "shift" profits (i.e. IP can be charged directly from the home country at preferential rates and/or terms; post the 2017 TCJA, this happens in the U.S. via the FDII-regime).

Research in June 2018 identified Ireland as the world's largest BEPS hub. Ireland is larger than the aggregate Caribbean tax haven BEPS system, excluding Bermuda. The largest global BEPS hubs, from the Zucman–Tørsløv–Wier table below, are synonymous with the top 10 global tax havens:

(†) Mostly consists of The Cayman Islands and The British Virgin Islands

Research in September 2018, by the National Bureau of Economic Research, using repatriation tax data from the TCJA, said that: "In recent years, about half of the foreign profits of U.S. multinationals have been booked in tax haven affiliates, most prominently in Ireland (18%), Switzerland, and Bermuda plus Caribbean tax havens (8%–9% each). One of the authors of this research was also quoted as saying, "Ireland solidifies its position as the #1 tax haven.... U.S. firms book more profits in Ireland than in China, Japan, Germany, France & Mexico combined. Irish tax rate: 5.7%."

Tools

Research identifies three main BEPS techniques used for "shifting" profits to a corporate tax haven via OECD–compliant BEPS tools:

BEPS tools could not function if the corporate tax haven did not have a network of bilateral tax treaties that accept the haven's BEPS tools, which "shift" the profits to the haven. Modern corporate tax havens, which are the main global BEPS hubs, have extensive networks of bilateral tax treaties. The U.K. is the leader with over 122, followed by the Netherlands with over 100. The "blacklisting" of a corporate tax haven is a serious event, which is why major BEPS hubs are OECD-compliant. Ireland was the first major corporate tax haven to be "blacklisted" by a G20 economy: Brazil in September 2016.

An important academic study in July 2017 published in Nature, "Conduit and Sink OFCs", showed that the pressure to maintain OECD–compliance had split corporate–focused tax havens into two different classifications: Sink OFCs, which act as the terminus for BEPS flows, and Conduit OFCs, which act as the conduit for flows from higher–tax locations to the Sink OFCs. It was noted that the five major Conduit OFCs, namely, Ireland, the Netherlands, the United Kingdom, Singapore and Switzerland, all have a top–ten ranking in the 2018 Global Innovation Property Centre (GIPC) IP Index".

Once profits are "shifted" to the corporate tax haven (or Conduit OFC), additional tools are used to avoid paying headline tax rates in the haven. Some of the tools are OECD–compliant (e.g. patent boxes, Capital Allowances for Intangible Assets ("CAIA") or "Green Jersey"), others became OECD–proscribed (e.g. Double Irish and Dutch Double–Dipping), while others have not attracted OECD attention (e.g. Single Malt).

Because BEPS hubs (or Conduit OFCs) need extensive bilateral tax treaties (e.g. so that their BEPS tools will be accepted by the higher–tax locations), they go to great lengths to obscure the fact that effective tax rates paid by multinationals in their jurisdiction are close to zero percent, rather than the headline corporate tax rate of the haven (see Table 1). Higher–tax jurisdictions do not enter into full bilateral tax treaties with obvious tax havens (e.g. the Cayman Islands, a major Sink OFC). That is achieved with financial secrecy laws, and by the avoidance of country–by–country reporting ("CbCr") or the need to file public accounts, by multinationals in the haven's jurisdiction. BEPS hubs (or Conduit OFCs) strongly deny they are corporate tax havens, and that their use of IP is as a tax avoidance tool. They call themselves "knowledge economies".

The complex accounting tools, and the detailed tax legislation, that corporate tax havens require to become OECD–compliant BEPS hubs, requires both advanced international tax–law professional services firms, and a high degree of coordination with the State, who encode their BEPS tools into the State's statutory legislation. Tax investigators call such jurisdictions "captured states", and explain that most leading BEPS hubs started as established financial centres, where the necessary skills and State support for tax avoidance tools, already existed.

Agendas

The BEPS tools used by tax havens have been known and discussed for decades in Washington. For example, when Ireland was pressured by the EU–OECD to close its double Irish BEPS tool, the largest in history, to new entrants in January 2015, existing users, which include Google and Facebook, were given a five-year extension to 2020. Even before 2015, Ireland had already publicly replaced the double Irish with two new BEPS tools: the single malt (as used by Microsoft and Allergan), and capital allowances for intangible assets ("CAIA"), also called the "Green Jersey", (as used by Apple in Q1 2015). None of these new BEPS tools have been as yet proscribed by the OECD. Tax experts show that disputes between higher-tax jurisdictions and tax havens are very rare.

Tax experts describe a more complex picture of an implicit acceptance by Washington that U.S. multinationals could use BEPS tools on non–U.S. earnings to offset the very high U.S. 35% corporate tax rate from the historical U.S. "worldwide" corporate tax system (see source of contradictions). Other tax experts, including a founder of academic tax haven research, James R. Hines Jr., note that U.S. multinational use of BEPS tools and corporate tax havens had actually increased the long–term tax receipts of the U.S. Treasury, at the expense of other higher–tax jurisdictions, making the U.S a major beneficiary of BEPS tools and corporate-tax havens.

The 1994 Hines–Rice paper on U.S. multinational use of tax havens was the first to use the term profit shifting. Hines–Rice concluded, "low foreign tax rates [from tax havens] ultimately enhance U.S. tax collections". For example, the Tax Cuts and Jobs Act of 2017 ("TCJA") levied 15.5% on the untaxed offshore cash reserves built up by U.S. multinationals with BEPS tools from 2004 to 2017. Had the U.S. multinationals not used BEPS tools and paid their full foreign taxes, their foreign tax credits would have removed most of their residual exposure to any U.S. tax liability, under the U.S. tax code.

The U.S. was one of the only major developed nations not to sign up to the 2016  to curtail BEPS tools.

Failure of OECD (2012–2016)

The 2012 G20 Los Cabos summit tasked the OECD to develop a BEPS Action Plan, which 2013 G-20 St. Petersburg summit approved. The project is intended to prevent multinationals from shifting profits from higher- to lower-tax jurisdictions. An OECD BEPS Multilateral Instrument, consisting of 15 Actions designed to be implemented domestically and through bilateral tax treaty provisions, were agreed at the 2015 G20 Antalya summit.

The OECD BEPS Multilateral Instrument ("MLI"), was adopted on 24 November 2016 and has since been signed by over 78 jurisdictions. It came into force in July 2018. Many tax havens opted out from several of the Actions, including Action 12 (Disclosure of aggressive tax planning), which was considered onerous by corporations who use BEPS tools.

The acknowledged architect of the largest ever global corporate BEPS tools (e.g. Google and Facebooks' Double Irish and Apple's Green Jersey), tax partner Feargal O'Rourke from PriceWaterhouseCoopers ("PwC), predicted in May 2015 that the OECD's MLI would be a success for the leading corporate tax havens, at the expense of the smaller, less developed, traditional tax havens, whose BEPS tools were not sufficiently robust.

In August 2016, the Tax Justice Network's Alex Cobham described the OECD's MLI as a failure due to the opt–outs and watering–down of individual BEPS Actions. In December 2016, Cobham highlighted one of the key anti–BEPS Actions, full public country–by–country–reporting ("CbCr"), had been dropped due to lobbying by the U.S. multinationals. Country–by–country reporting is the only way to observe the level of BEPS activity and OECD compliance in any country conclusively .

In June 2017, a U.S. Treasury official explained that the reason why U.S. refused to sign up to the OECD's MLI, or any of its Actions, was because: "the U.S. tax treaty network has a low degree of exposure to base erosion and profit shifting issues".

Failure of TCJA (2017–2018)

The Tax Cuts and Jobs Act of 2017 ("TCJA") moved the U.S. from a "worldwide" corporate tax system to a hybrid "territorial" tax system. The TCJA includes anti–BEPS tool regimes including the GILTI–tax and BEAT–tax regimes. It also contains its own BEPS tools, namely the FDII–tax regime. The TCJA could represent a major change in Washington's tolerance of U.S. multinational use of BEPS tools. Tax experts in early 2018 forecast the demise of the two major U.S. corporate tax havens, Ireland and Singapore, in the expectation that U.S. multinationals would no longer need foreign BEPS tools.

However, by mid–2018, U.S. multinationals had not repatriated any BEPS tools, and the evidence is that they have increased exposure to corporate tax havens. In March–May 2018, Google committed to doubling its office space in Ireland, while in June 2018 it was shown that Microsoft is preparing to execute Apple's Irish BEPS tool, the "Green Jersey" (see Irish experience post–TCJA). In July 2018, an Irish tax expert Seamus Coffey, forecasted a potential boom in U.S. multinationals on–shoring their BEPS tools from the Caribbean to Ireland, and not to the U.S. as was expected after TCJA.

In May 2018, it was shown that the TCJA contains technical issues that incentivise these actions. For example, by accepting Irish tangible, and intangible, capital allowances in the GILTI calculation, Irish BEPS tools like the "Green Jersey" enable U.S. multinationals to achieve U.S. effective tax rates of 0–3% via the TCJA's foreign participation relief system. There is debate as to whether they are drafting mistakes to be corrected or concessions to enable U.S. multinationals to reduce their effective corporate tax rates to circa 10% (the Trump administration's original target).

In February 2019, Brad Setser from the Council on Foreign Relations (CoFR), wrote an article for The New York Times'' highlighting material issues with TCJA in terms of curtailing U.S. corporate use of major tax havens such as Ireland, the Netherlands, and Singapore.

Setser followed up his New York Times piece on the CoFR website with:

OECD BEPS 2.0 (2019)(2021)

On 29 January 2019, the OECD released a policy note regarding new proposals to combat the BEPS activities of multinationals, which commentators labeled "BEPS 2.0". In its press release, the OECD announced its proposals had the backing of the U.S., as well as China, Brazil, and India.

Irish-based media highlighted a particular threat to Ireland as the world's largest BEPS hub, regarding proposals to move to a global system of taxation based on where the product is consumed or used, and not where its IP has been located. The IIEA chief economist described the OECD proposal as "a move last week [that] may bring the day of reckoning closer". The Head of Tax for PwC in Ireland said, "There's a limited number of [consumers] users in Ireland and [the proposal under consideration] would obviously benefit the much larger countries".

As of 8 October 2021 OECD has stated a new Two-Pillar Solution to Address the Tax Challenges Arising from the Digitalization of the Economy. The scope of pillar one is in-scope companies are the multinational enterprises (MNEs) with global turnover above 20 billion euros and profitability above 10% (i.e. profit before tax/revenue) calculated using an averaging mechanism with the turnover threshold to be reduced to 10 billion euros, contingent on successful implementation including of tax certainty on Amount A, with the relevant review beginning 7 years after the agreement comes into force, and the review being completed in no more than one year. Extractives and Regulated Financial Services are excluded. Tax base determination: The relevant measure of profit or loss of the in-scope MNE will be determined by reference to financial accounting income, with a small number of adjustments. Losses will be carried forward. Elimination of double taxation : Double taxation of profit allocated to market jurisdictions will be relieved using either the exemption or credit method. The entity (or entities) that will bear the tax liability will be drawn from those that earn residual profit.

Pillar Two Overall design

Pillar Two consists of:

• two interlocking domestic rules (together the Global anti-Base Erosion Rules (GloBE) rules): (i) an Income Inclusion Rule (IIR), which imposes top-up tax on a parent entity in respect of the low taxed income of a constituent entity; and (ii) an Undertaxed Payment Rule (UTPR), which denies deductions or requires an equivalent adjustment to the extent the low tax income of a constituent entity is not subject to tax under an IIR; and

• a treaty-based rule (the Subject to Tax Rule (STTR)) that allows source jurisdictions to impose limited source taxation on certain related party payments subject to tax below a minimum rate. The STTR will be creditable as a covered tax under the GloBE rules.

Scope The GloBE rules will apply to MNEs that meet the 750 million euros threshold as determined under BEPS Action 13 (country by country reporting). Countries are free to apply the IIR to MNEs headquartered in their country even if they do not meet the threshold. Government entities, international organisations, non-profit organisations, pension funds or investment funds that are Ultimate Parent Entities (UPE) of an MNE Group or any holding vehicles used by such entities, organisations or funds are not subject to the GloBE rules.

Minimum rate: The minimum tax rate used for purposes of the IIR and UTPR will be 15%.

See also
Tax haven
Country-by-Country Reporting
Conduit and Sink OFCs
James R. Hines Jr.
Helena Malikova
Gabriel Zucman
Ireland as a tax haven
Transfer mispricing

Notes

References

External links
 OECD BEPS Portal
 Ernst & Young BEPS Portal
 KPMG BEPS Portal

Competition (economics)
International business
International taxation
Pricing
Tax avoidance
Corporate tax avoidance
Offshore finance
Corporate taxation in the United States
Corporate taxation in Canada
Global issues